James William Harris (November 24, 1943 – December 20, 2020) was a Major League Baseball second baseman who played for two seasons. He played for the Cleveland Indians in 1968 and the Kansas City Royals in 1969.

He died on December 20, 2020, at his home in Hampstead, NC.

References

External links

1943 births
2020 deaths
Major League Baseball second basemen
Cleveland Indians players
Kansas City Royals players
UNC Wilmington Seahawks baseball players
Baseball players from North Carolina
People from Hamlet, North Carolina